Little Whale Cay is a small private island.

History
Little Whale Cay was developed in the 1930s as a private island residence by Wallace Groves, a US businessman with a strong interest in the Bahamas. He sold the island in 1985 to the current owner, Peter Austin, a British Millionaire with connections with the Saudi royal family. Residents and employees during Groves' ownership report that he ran the island in police-state fashion.

The island is as of December 2020 for sale with a listing price of US$60 million.

The  island is commercially hired to paying guests.

Facilities
The island is served by the Lt. Whale Cay Airport  and by a small harbour. Travel to the island is easiest from Nassau or Ft. Lauderdale (mainland USA) either direct to the Cay (in the case of Nassau flights) or via the local customs office on Chubb Cay (In the case of Miami flights). The island has three houses for guests to hire; Little Whale, Peacock and Flamingo. Guests can use facilities including a sea-view infinity pool, fitness centre, tennis court, harbour and boats for fishing, cruising or water sports. The establishment has 8 full-time staff, 2 full-time managers, 2 full-time engineers for the maintenance of the generators and boats, 3 full-time gardeners. When guests are present on the Cay these are supplemented with maids, chef, stewardess and masseuse bringing the staff to 13. In the past scuba instructors have also been made available for guests.

Wildlife
Manatees and green turtles are sometimes present in the waters surrounding the Cay. Birds found at Little Whale Cay include flamingos, Bahamian duck and Bahama woodstar hummingbirds and domestic peacocks. The origin of many of the birds present on the Cay can be traced back to Wallace Groves' bird collection. In the past many of the houses in the small "downtown" area were bird houses.

External links
Little Whale Cay website
Private Islands Online

References

Berry Islands
Private islands of the Bahamas